Salem Baptist Church is a Baptist church located in Logansport, Butler County, Kentucky, and is affiliated with the Southern Baptist Convention and the Cooperative Baptist Fellowship. Since 2011, Salem's pastor has been Rev. Derek A. Cain.

History 

The founding of Salem Baptist Church was a result of the Second Great Awakening. Between 1830 and 1910 the number of Baptist churches in Kentucky tripled, from 574 to 1,774 and church membership increased five-fold from 39,975 to 224,237. In 1838 the Beaver Dam Baptist Church in Ohio County, Kentucky granted part of its congregation leave to constitute an independent body, known as Salem, in the Big Bend of the Green River. Although isolated— separated by seven miles of treacherous roads northwest of the county seat of Morgantown, which itself contained fewer than 500 citizens in 1850—the Big Bend was the site of a busy wharf (Borah’s Landing) and boasted several ferries. The people had easy contact with the outside world via steamboats on the Green River.

Salem’s congregants first met in a log house, but in 1849 they constructed a more commodious structure which accommodated their meetings and a school. The school building is now used for church and community functions, including the Big Bend Rural Development Club. In 1857, the congregation began construction on a new building that was to be used strictly as a church facility. It was completed in 1860. The congregation met on October 1, 1856 and resolved to constitute a Sunday School by electing pro tem officers who would conduct a meeting later in the month to officially organize the school.

On January 4, 1905, the church purchased the three fourths of an acre from R.L. Render on the south side of the road, where the current church building now stands. It was dedicated in 1915. Minutes include an offer from Monticello Baptist Church in Provo, Kentucky for the use of their church during the construction of Salem. Over the years, new classrooms, a basement, and many other improvements have been made.

100 years later the church broke ground on a new space for ministry. This additional space was completed in the summer of 2016. This new building is adjacent to the sanctuary. Its use is for fellowship meals, bible school, children and adult Sunday School classes, weddings, community use, and youth gatherings.

Partnerships and Associations 
Salem Baptist Church freely affiliates and partners with the Southern Baptist Convention, the Kentucky Baptist Convention, the Gasper River Association of Baptists, the Cooperative Baptist Fellowship, the Cooperative Baptist Fellowship of Kentucky, and other local churches, ministries, and organizations. We support ministries and missionaries through the Southern Baptist Convention and the Cooperative Baptist Fellowship.

Pastors

Pastors by Year

Biographies of Pastors

Joshua Render 
Joshua Render was a brother to George Render who was an early member of Beaver Dam church. George was ordained to the ministry in 1813. George was highly esteemed for consistent piety, rather than for any superior ability. Joshua was also a longtime member of Beaver Dam church. He was like his brothers, a very moderate preacher. He represented Beaver Dam church in the Association for 15 years. He was pastor of Salem from its constitution, in 1838, until 1842. The time of his death has not be ascertained.

Alfred Taylor 
Alfred Taylor often preached in private houses in the community before the constitution of the church. He first became pastor of the church in 1854 and returned in 1859 and served until 1863. Previously he was pastor of the Sandy Creek Baptist Church and served there 2 years.

Rev. William H. (Bill) Rogers 
Rogers was married to Martha Louise McPherson on January 15, 1944, and in September 1944 enlisted in the US Army, reaching the rank of 1st Lieutenant and serving with the Occupation forces in Japan. After working in home construction for several years, he was ordained as a Baptist minister in 1949 and resumed his college education. While studying at Western Kentucky College, he was pastor at Salem Baptist Church in Logansport KY, then in 1954 moved to Eastwood Baptist Church in Bowling Green KY as its founding pastor. In 1961 he became pastor at Melbourne Heights Baptist Church in Louisville KY and completed his studies at the Southern Baptist Theological Seminary in May 1964. He joined the Kentucky Baptist Convention staff in 1971 and served as Director of Interracial Relations, Director of the Minister/Church Support Division, and post-retirement as Pastoral Consultant on the Leadership Development Team. He also served as an interim pastor for many churches and on the staff at Cedar Creek Baptist Church. Rogers, 95 died peacefully on Tuesday, December 25th, 2018. He lived a long, full life as a father, pastor, mentor and friend to many.

Rev. Derek A. Cain 
Rev. Derek A. Cain is the current pastor of Salem. He became the pastor at Salem on October 9, 2011. Cain is from Pulaski County, Kentucky. He graduated from Berea College in 2005 with a B.A. in Education. He attained his M.Div. from the Baptist Seminary of Kentucky in Georgetown, KY in 2015. He was ordained to the work of the gospel by the authority and order of the Berea Baptist Church, Berea, KY on July 15, 2012. Along with pastoring Salem Baptist Church, Cain began working as the Chaplain and Director of Spirituality at Morgantown Care and Rehabilitation Center in Morgantown, KY in January 2014.

Other Data

Related Topics 

 Southern Baptist Convention conservative resurgence

Citations 

Baptist churches in Kentucky
Buildings and structures in Butler County, Kentucky
Wooden churches in Kentucky
1838 establishments in Kentucky